Research4Life, is a platform and website dedicated to making peer-reviewed knowledge public to students and researchers in lower income countries. Research4Life provides free or low cost access to academic and professional peer-reviewed content online. In 2021 Research4Life offered 132,000 leading journals and books in the fields of health, agriculture, environment, applied sciences and legal information.

Five  programs
Research4Life consists of five programs:
 HINARI, research for health;
 AGORA, research on agriculture;
 ARDI, research for development and Innovation;
 OARE, research in the environment 
 GOALI, research for global justice.

External links

References

Scientific organizations